Fort Slemmer sometimes called Battery Slemmer was one of seven temporary earthwork forts part of the Civil War Defenses of Washington, D.C., during the Civil War built in the Northeast quadrant of the city at the beginning of the Civil War by the Union Army to protect the city from the Confederate Army. From west to east, the forts were as follow: Fort Slocum, Fort Totten, Fort Slemmer, Fort Bunker Hill, Fort Saratoga, Fort Thayer and Fort Lincoln. Unlike other forts, today very little remains of the structure.

Civil War

The fort was named in honor of Lieutenant Adam J. Slemmer. It was built in August 1861 between Fort Totten and Fort Bunker Hill on the east side of Harewood Road just north of The Catholic University of America's Marist Hall. In February 1862, the 20th New York moved in the fort.

The fort was equipped with the following armament:
 Three 32-pounder James guns
 One 8-inch siege howitzer

The following troops garrisoned in the fort:
 20th New York
 Several New Hampshire Heavy Artillery
 150th Ohio National Guard
 Battery G, 3rd United States Artillery

Post Civil War
The fort was abandoned at the end of the civil war in 1865. It fell in disrepair after the war.

See also

 Civil War Defenses of Washington
 Washington, D.C., in the American Civil War
 Fort Slocum
 Fort Totten
 Fort Bunker Hill
 Fort Saratoga
 Fort Thayer
 Fort Lincoln
 Battle of Fort Stevens

References

External links
 
 Civil War Defenses of Washington official website

Bunker Hill, Fort
Bunker Hill, Fort
Bunker Hill
Bunker
American Civil War on the National Register of Historic Places
Parks in Washington, D.C.
Demolished buildings and structures in Washington, D.C.
Washington, D.C., in the American Civil War
1861 establishments in Washington, D.C.